Malangen Church is a parish church of the Church of Norway in Balsfjord Municipality in Troms og Finnmark county, Norway. It is located in the village of Mortenhals. It is the church for the Malangen parish which is part of the Senja prosti (deanery) in the Diocese of Nord-Hålogaland. The white, wooden church was built in a long church style in 1853 by local builders. The church seats about 280 people. The building was consecrated on 31 August 1853.

See also
List of churches in Nord-Hålogaland

References

Balsfjord
Churches in Troms
Wooden churches in Norway
19th-century Church of Norway church buildings
Churches completed in 1853
1853 establishments in Norway
Long churches in Norway